The Ambassador of Malaysia to the Russian Federation is the head of Malaysia's diplomatic mission to Russia. The position has the rank and status of an Ambassador Extraordinary and Plenipotentiary and is based in the Embassy of Malaysia, Moscow.

History 
Malaysia and the Soviet Union established diplomatic relations on 3 April 1967, and the first Ambassador was posted to Moscow on 6 October 1968.

List of heads of mission

Ambassadors to the Soviet Union

Ambassadors to Russia

See also
 Malaysia–Soviet Union relations
 Malaysia–Russia relations

References 

 
Malaysia
Russia